Michaela du Toit (born January 10, 2000) is a figure skater representing South Africa and an actress. She is the 2015 and 2017 South African National Champion. She starred in the Family Channel’s 2016 film Ice Girls alongside two-time Olympic silver medalist Elvis Stojko.

Personal life 
Michaela du Toit was born on January 10, 2000, in Poole, England, but she grew up in Toronto, Canada. She started playing hockey at the age of six, but she decided to switch to figure skating, and she originally represented Canada before switching to South Africa, which is where her family is originally from.

In 2016, she made her acting debut playing the character Mattie in the TV movie Ice Girl.

Skating career 
du Toit began competing in the ISU Junior Grand Prix (JGP) in the 2013–14 season. She was assigned to the JGP Mexico where she finished 16th. She also won the 2013 junior South African national title. She competed at her first Junior World Championships in 2014 where she finished 37th in the short program and did not advance to the free skate. She then received two assignments in the 2014–15 ISU Junior Grand Prix. She finished 15th in the JGP Japan and 12th in the JGP Germany. She won her second junior South African national title in 2014. At the 2015 Junior World Championships, she finished 37th again. She won her first senior South African National Championships in 2015.

She received two assignments in the 2015–16 ISU Junior Grand Prix. She finished 18th in the JGP Poland and 13th in the JGP Spain. She competed at the 2016 Four Continents Championships where she finished 18th. She finished 31st at the 2016 Junior World Championships.

du Toit competed at the 2016 Autumn Classic International where she finished 15th. She won her second senior national title in 2017. At the 2017 Four Continents Championships, she finished 23rd in the short program but then withdrew before the free skate.

Programs

Competitive highlights
GP: Grand Prix; JGP: Junior Grand Prix

References

External links 

 
 

2000 births
Living people
White South African people
South African female single skaters
Figure skaters from Toronto